S-13 was a Stalinets-class submarine of the Soviet Navy.  Her keel was laid down by Krasnoye Sormovo in Gorky on 19 October 1938. She was launched on 25 April 1939 and commissioned on 31 July 1941 in the Baltic Fleet, under the command of Captain Pavel Malantyenko. The submarine is best known for the 1945 sinking of Wilhelm Gustloff, a German military transport ship/converted cruise ship. With a career total of 44,701 GRT (gross register tonnage) sunk or damaged, she is the highest-scoring Soviet submarine in history.

Service history 
When S-13 sank the freighter Hera, she fired on the ship's lifeboat but failed to hit it.

On 15 October 1942, caught on the surface while charging her batteries, S-13 was attacked by the Finnish submarine chasers VMV-13 and VMV-15.  During her crash dive, the submarine hit the bottom, severely damaging her rudder and destroying her steering gear.  The following depth charge attack worsened the damage, but S-13 escaped and made it back to Kronstadt.

During the next three years, Malantyenko was relieved by Alexander Marinesko and S-13 was repaired and returned to sea.

Under the command of Marinesko, then 32, on 30 January 1945, at Stolpe Bank off the Pomeranian coast, S-13 sank the 25,484-ton German armed transport ship Wilhelm Gustloff under Kriegsmarine ensign, overfilled with civilians and military personnel, with three torpedoes. Recent calculations estimate more than 9,000 people were killed, the worst loss of life in maritime history.

On 10 February 1945, S-13 sank another German military transport ship General von Steuben. 3,300 civilians and military personnel from the ship died, and 300 survived.

Marinesko was posthumously awarded the title Hero of the Soviet Union in 1990.

S-13 was decommissioned on 7 September 1954 and stricken on 17 December 1956.

S-13 also shelled and damaged the German fishing vessel, Siegfried (563 GRT), which was damaged but escaped.

References 

Soviet S-class submarines
Ships built in the Soviet Union
1939 ships
World War II submarines of the Soviet Union